The 2020 European Pairs Speedway Championship was the 17th edition of the European Pairs Speedway Championship. the final was held in Terenzano, Italy on 17 October. 

The title was won by Poland for the eighth time.

Final

See also 
 2020 Speedway European Championship

References 

2020
European Championship Pairs
Speedway European Championship